The Hotel Waverly was a four-storey low-rise hotel in downtown Toronto. Opened in 1900, the hotel was built for J.J. Powell. It was one of the oldest Toronto hotels in continuous operation.

Location
Hotel Waverly was at 484 Spadina Avenue on the northwest corner of Spadina Avenue and College Street, adjacent to Toronto's Chinatown. It was adjacent to The Silver Dollar Room, which was added to the hotel in 1958. The Scott Mission was next door.

The hotel's central location was close to major attractions such as the Art Gallery of Ontario, Queen's Park, The Royal Ontario Museum and Kensington Market, making it a prime target for redevelopment.

Accommodations 
The Waverly's interior rooms were modest but comfortable. This accommodation provides low-cost housing benefiting Toronto's transient community as well as monthly residents. Its proximity to the mission has kept rental rates low, attracting customers who are looking for a deal in downtown.  The hotel offers 24-hour laundry facilities, free parking and snack counter.

Notability
Though he denied it, evidence points towards James Earl Ray staying at the Waverly while hiding out in Toronto after shooting Martin Luther King Jr. It was also the longtime home of poet Milton Acorn; several of his most acclaimed works depict the life in the neighbourhood. In popular culture the hotel was the setting for the opening scene of the Elmore Leonard novel Killshot and was also featured in the film version. The hotel is also briefly pictured in the music video for "Games for Days" by Julian Plenti (a.k.a. Paul Banks), and the music video for "Man I Used to Be," by Canadian musician k-os. Also used in the Canadian movie "Code 8" written by Jeff Chan and starring Robbie and Stephen Amell.

Closure and Demolition
The Wynn Group, a Toronto-based rental group and building developer, have proposed to construct a 20-storey building with 202 rental units aimed at Toronto's university students. The Silver Dollar Room would be reopened on the first floor.

The hotel permanently closed in 2017. In March 2018, Fitzrovia Real Estate acquired the approved plans and site, confirming that the new purpose-built rental tower would be called "The Waverley"  The hotel was demolished that summer.

References

External links
 Waverly Hotel

Hotels in Toronto
Demolished hotels
Demolished buildings and structures in Toronto
Buildings and structures demolished in 2018
2017 disestablishments in Ontario
Buildings and structures completed in 1900
Defunct hotels in Canada